Zophopetes nobilior, commonly known as the noble nightfighter, is a butterfly in the family Hesperiidae. It is found in Gabon, the eastern part of the Democratic Republic of the Congo, Tanzania, Uganda and Kenya. In Kenya the introduced coconut has been recorded as food plant. Like other species in its genus, the imago has crepuscular habits. It is known to feed from flowers at dawn.

References

Butterflies described in 1896
Erionotini
Butterflies of Africa